is a former Japanese football player. She played for the Japan national team.

National team career
Ishida was born on March 11, 1966. In June 1981, when she was 15 years old, she was selected by the Japan national team for the 1981 AFC Championship. At this competition, on June 7, she debuted against Chinese Taipei. This match was the Japan team's first match in an International A Match. She played in two matches at this championship. She played three games for Japan, including this competition, in 1981.

National team statistics

References

1966 births
Living people
Japanese women's footballers
Japan women's international footballers
Women's association footballers not categorized by position